Ibrahim Sobh (1901 – 1969) was an Egyptian wrestler. He competed in the men's Greco-Roman heavyweight at the 1928 Summer Olympics.

References

External links
 

1901 births
1969 deaths
Egyptian male sport wrestlers
Olympic wrestlers of Egypt
Wrestlers at the 1928 Summer Olympics
20th-century Egyptian people